Captain Sir Lionel de Lautour Wells, CB, CMG, CBE (31 January 1859 – 15 March 1929) was a British naval officer, fire brigade officer, and political agent. After a career in the Royal Navy which began in 1871, he was Chief Officer of the Metropolitan Fire Brigade from 1896 to 1903, when he became Chief Agent of the Conservative Party, serving until his resignation 1905. During the First World War, he returned to active service, for which he was appointed CB, CMG, and CBE, as well as receiving the American Distinguished Service Medal. He was knighted in 1921.

References 

Knights Bachelor
1929 deaths
Royal Navy officers
Royal Navy officers of World War I
Companions of the Order of the Bath
Commanders of the Order of the British Empire
Conservative Party (UK) officials
London Fire Brigade personnel
Companions of the Order of St Michael and St George